Kovylkino (Lašma oš) is a town in the Republic of Mordovia, Russia, located  southwest of Saransk on the left bank of the Moksha River (a tributary of the Oka). Population:

History
Town status was granted to it in 1960.

Administrative and municipal status
Within the framework of administrative divisions, Kovylkino serves as the administrative center of Kovylkinsky District, even though it is not a part of it. As an administrative division, it is, together with the settlement of Sosnovy Bor, incorporated separately as the town of republic significance of Kovylkino—an administrative unit with the status equal to that of the districts. As a municipal division, the town of republic significance of Kovylkino is incorporated within Kovylkinsky Municipal District as Kovylkino Urban Settlement.

Infrastructure

There are more than 150 enterprises and organisations, 2 churches and an estate of Insar's monastery, 5 secondary schools, a children's summer camp "Ryzhik", a children's sanatorium "Sosnoviy Bor" in Kovylkino today.
There also are a creamery, an electromechanical factory, an affiliated society of Mordovian State University, a central district hospital, a House of Culture, a Museum of local lore, as well as special schools: a musical one, an arts one, and a sports one.
Kovylkinsky Agraria-building college is a local branch of Mordovian State University.

Trade
 Magnit — 3 points of sale.
 Bristol — 2 points of sale.
 Euroset — 1 point of sale.
 Pyaterochka — 3 points of sale.
 Krasnoe & Beloe — 1 point of sale.
 Gorod'ok — 1 point of sale.
and other small points of sale.

Shopping centres:
 «Kouprey»
 «SpecMarket»
 «Rainbow» (Raduga/Радуга)

Factory
 JSC "Kirpich silikatnyi" (currently bankrupt)
 JSC "KEMF"

Internet and communication

Notable residents 

Mikhail Markin (born 1993), football player

References

Notes

Sources

Cities and towns in Mordovia